Paul Milton Downing (November 27, 1873 – December 11, 1944) was an American college football player and coach.  He played at Stanford University and was the head coach at Oregon Agricultural College (today's Oregon State University).  While at Stanford, he was friends with classmate and future United States President Herbert Hoover.

After his football days, Downing went on to become a top executive at Pacific Gas and Electric Company.  He was actively involved in creation of hydroelectric power facilities.  He died at the age of 71 on December 11, 1944 in San Francisco, California.

Football

Stanford
Downing played four years for the Stanford Cardinal football team, never missing a minute of play in all four years.  Downing played in the first Big Game matchup between Stanford and the University of California, Berkeley.

Oregon Agriculture College
In 1895, Downing became the third head coach of Oregon Agricultural College and held the post for the program's third season.  He served as the head coach for the 1895 season and his team produced a record of 0 wins, 2 losses, and 1 tie.

Head coaching record

See also
 History of Oregon State Beavers football

References

1873 births
1944 deaths
19th-century players of American football
American energy industry executives
Oregon State Beavers football coaches
Stanford Cardinal football players
People from Knox County, Missouri